Albuquerque is the primary media hub of the US state of New Mexico, which includes Santa Fe and Las Cruces. The vistas and adobe architecture of New Mexico are a major backdrop of Western fiction and the Western genre. The media of Albuquerque and New Mexico has international influence, including important production studios, newspapers, magazines, radio and television studios.

Albuquerque, Santa Fe, Las Cruces, and broader New Mexico work with the largest media markets in the world, from national New York and Los Angeles, to international India and Japan. Which often leverage New Mexico's location as a central hub for North America, New Mexico has a large English and Spanish speaking population which are two of the major languages in the Americas. Some of the city's media conglomerates include Netflix's Albuquerque Studios, NBCUniversal, The Walt Disney Company, and Warner Bros. Discovery. Leveraging the talent of theatrical troupes and creative studios; Blackout Theatre, Cliffdweller Studios, and Heaven Sent Gaming.

Albuquerque is home to the largest daily newspaper with the largest circulation in New Mexico: Albuquerque Journal, which is considered the "newspaper of record" for New Mexico alongside The Santa Fe New Mexican. Major magazines and other news publications in the city include Albuquerque the Magazine, Albuquerque Business First, and  University of New Mexico has their Daily lobo publication. Su Casa Magazine and Outside have a national reach, and New Mexico Magazine is widely circulated in the city.

Major American broadcast networks, ABC, CBS/Fox, NBC, Telemundo, Trinity Broadcasting Network, and Univision, all have channels and studios in the city. Public Broadcasting has a NM PBS presence through sister stations KNME-TV and KNMD-TV. The public radio station KANW plays some NPR programming, but is mainly known for playing the New Mexico music genre. Native American and Hispanic outlets are well-represented in the region due to the demographics of the city, programs like National Native News and Spanish-language programming are regular in the region. Albuquerque's Christian media is accepted with its media culture, with New Mexican churches and Christians having established radio programs, sermon broadcasts, and other creative outlets.

The following is a list of media operations within the greater Albuquerque metropolitan area, and some media in broader Albuquerque–Santa Fe–Las Vegas and neighboring El Paso–Las Cruces, Texas–New Mexico combined statistical area, which also target Albuquerque.

Studios
 ABC affiliate KOAT-TV: Hearst Television owns and operates the station and produces local news as Action 7 News, and they produce online program Very Local.
 Albuquerque Studios: One of the main production hubs for Netflix. The studios have been used for numerous major productions including Breaking Bad, The Avengers, Logan, and Stranger Things season 4.
 Blackout Theatre: Theatrical troupe and drama team known for creating numerous drama and comedy productions. One such example is the character "Lynette LaBurqueña", played by Lauren Poole, is an homage to central New Mexico's Burqueña archetype. Lynette has been featured as an educational device about the New Mexican English accent at University of New Mexico, and in commercials such as the New Mexico State Fair.
 CBS and FOX affiliate KRQE: Production studio for KRQE News 13 and the New Mexico Living programming blocks.
 Cliffdweller Studios: A film production studio active in Rio Rancho and Albuquerque, best known for their New Mexico True Television travel series and a morning show called Good Day New Mexico. Their primary host Michael Newman and their productions have won three regional Emmy Awards.
 Heaven Sent Gaming: Christian multimedia studio, founded by married childhood sweethearts Mario and Isabel Lucero. Their several publications include an original fictional universe such as the comic strip Reverie, as well as a New Mexico Cultural Encyclopedia & Lexicon.
 Hubbard Broadcasting station KOB (TV), and their nationwide Reelz digital cable and satellite television network: KOB and Reelz operate independently from one another and have separate facilities, as KOB is affiliated with NBC as well. KOB was the primary production studio for the internationally syndicated Val De La O Show variety show during the 1960s-1980s, it was the first "to pioneer a Spanish-language show on TV" and brought international attention to the New Mexico music, Tejano music, and Texas country music genres. Reelz has created programs such as The Kennedys, and documentaries hosted by Natalie Morales, Deborah Norville, and Geraldo Rivera.
 NBCUniversal: They are currently investing in the Albuquerque area, with a major production studio facility in the metro for their major films and television shows. The television show MacGruber is produced in Albuquerque, as their studio opened in 2021. NBC is affiliated with Hubbard Broadcasting's KOB as well.
 Telemundo station KASA-TV: News studio for Noticias Telemundo Nuevo México. along with KOB and NBC they help to produce Spanish language news for the station.
 Trinity Broadcasting Network station KNAT-TV: Produces numerous televangelism shows for TBN, including Joy In Our Town and various Christian sermons.
 Univision station KLUZ-TV and their affiliate KTFQ-TV: Production studio for the Noticias Nuevo México news program.

Publications

Newspapers
 Albuquerque Business First: local business news, resources and more; printed weekly, daily morning and afternoon digital editions.
 Albuquerque Journal:  the largest newspaper in New Mexico; contains state and local news.
 CNM Chronicle: Central New Mexico Community College's student-run newspaper.
 Corrales Comment: a tiny newspaper covering some events in Corrales, New Mexico, with one writer, editor and publisher.
 Daily Lobo: independent student newspaper of the University of New Mexico.
The Paper: alternative independent newspaper printed weekly, daily digital editions, and online site.
 Valencia County News-Bulletin: weekly paper serving Belen, Bosque Farms, Los Lunas, Peralta, Rio Communities and all of Valencia County, New Mexico.

Magazines
 ABQ Arts & Entertainment: a free monthly magazine covering art, theater, music, dance and film.
 Albuquerque the Magazine: a monthly magazine chronicling life in Albuquerque.
 Around 505: celebrates the unique lifestyle in the metropolitan Southwest; covers upcoming performances from ballet to retro rock, home improvement tips, and a product showcase; free on the stands.
 Local Flavor:  a free, monthly magazine covering food and wine in northern New Mexico.
 New Mexico Kids!: a free family magazine packed with information for parents, grandparents, educators and young people; includes a comprehensive calendar of events, directories of schools, camps and afterschool activities, regular columns, and feature stories; distributed to more than 300 locations in and around Albuquerque, Santa Fe and Los Alamos; six issues are published each year.
 New Mexico MarketPlace: New Mexico's oldest and largest monthly shopper publication; distributed free of charge by direct mail to 175,000 recipient single-family households throughout the Albuquerque metro area.
 Su Casa Magazine: New Mexico's most trusted Home Building & Remodeling publication is distributed to Albuquerque, Santa Fe, Rio Rancho, Las Cruces, El Paso and surrounding areas. This 26-year-old publication features editorial about local builders, remodelers, interior design and decor, landscaping, food and travel.

Television
Full-powered stations

ATSC 3.0

Religious stations

Low-powered stations

Broadcast radio 
A number of radio stations are broadcast from and/or are licensed to Albuquerque, including the following:

AM stations

 610 KNML Albuquerque (Sports)
 700 KDAZ Albuquerque (Conservative talk/Christian)
 770 KKOB Albuquerque (Talk)
 810 KSWV Santa Fe (Classic hits)
 840 KJFA Belen (Hispanic rhythmic)
 920 KSVA Albuquerque (LifeTalk Radio)
 1000 KKIM Albuquerque (Spanish Christian)
 1050 KTBL Los Ranchos de Albuquerque (Active rock)
 1080 KEMR Moriarty (Classic hits/Oldies)
 1100 KRKE Peralta (80s Hits)
 1150 KNMM Albuquerque (Classic hits)
 1190 KXKS Albuquerque (Conservative talk)
 1240 KDSK Los Ranchos de Albuquerque (Oldies)
 1310 KKNS Corrales (KTNN/Navajo/country)
 1350 KABQ Albuquerque (Sports)
 1450 KRZY Albuquerque (Spanish sports)
 1510 KOAZ Isleta (Smooth jazz)
 1550 KQNM Albuquerque (Relevant Radio)
 1600 KIVA Albuquerque (Conservative talk)

FM stations
Asterisk (*) indicates a non-commercial (public radio/campus/educational) broadcast.

 88.3 KLYT Albuquerque (Christian)*
 88.7 KXNM Encino (KANW relay)*
 89.1 KANW Albuquerque (NPR/talk/New Mexico music)*
 89.9 KUNM Albuquerque (NPR/talk/variety)*
 90.3 KANM Grants (News and Talk  NPR/BBC)*
 90.7 KQLV Santa Fe (K-Love)*
 91.1 KEZF Grants (Variety)*
 91.5 KFLQ Albuquerque (Family Life Radio)*
 92.3 KRST Albuquerque (Country)
 92.7 KDSK-FM Grants (Oldies)
 93.3 KOBQ Albuquerque (Contemporary hit radio)
 94.1 KZRR Albuquerque (Active rock)
 95.1 KABQ-FM Corrales (Rhythmic oldies)
 95.5 KHFM Santa Fe (Classical)*
 96.3 KKOB-FM Albuquerque (Talk)
 96.7 KSFE Grants (EDM)
 97.3 KKSS Santa Fe (Rhythmic contemporary)
 97.7 KLVO Belen (Regional Mexican)
 98.5 KABG Los Alamos (Classic hits)
 99.5 KMGA Albuquerque (Adult contemporary)
 99.9 KMGG-LP Albuquerque (LPFM/urban contemporary)*
 100.3 KPEK Albuquerque (Hot AC)
 101.3 KYLZ Albuquerque (Hip-Hop)
 101.7 KQTM Rio Rancho (Sports)
 102.1 KQUQ-LP Albuquerque (LPFM/variety)*
 102.5 KIOT Los Lunas (Classic rock)
 103.3 KDRF Albuquerque (Adult hits)
 104.1 KTEG Santa Fe (Modern rock)
 104.7 KKTH Bosque Farms (Spanish Christian)
 105.1 KKRG Santa Fe (Hot AC)
 105.5 KQRI Bosque Farms (Air1)*
 105.9 KRZY Santa Fe (Grupero/Cumbia)
 106.3 KXOT Los Lunas (Regional Mexican)
 106.7 KVCN Los Alamos (VCY America)*
 107.1 KYFV Armijo (Bible Broadcasting Network)*
 107.9 KBQI Albuquerque (Country)

Translators
 92.9 K225CH Rio Rancho (Oldies, KDSK)
 93.7 K229CL Albuquerque (80s Hits, KRKE)
 94.5 K233CG Sandia (Active rock, KTBL)
 95.9 K240BL Albuquerque (Sports talk, KNML)
 96.9 K245CD Albuquerque (Conservative talk, KDAZ)
 98.1 K251AU Albuquerque (Classic country, KBQI HD2)
 98.9 K255AU Corrales (Catholic radio, KQNM)
 100.9 K265CA Albuquerque (Urban Contemporary, KZRR HD2)
 102.1 K271CP Albuquerque (Classic hits, KNMM)
 102.9 K275AO Albuquerque (Hispanic rhythmic, KJFA)
 103.7 K279BP Albuquerque (Smooth jazz, KOAZ)
 104.3 K282CD Los Lunas (LifeTalk Radio, KSVA)
 107.5 K298BY Albuquerque (News and talk, KANW HD2)*

Defunct publications
 Albuquerque Tribune: (1922-2008) An afternoon general newspaper, and former competitor to the Albuquerque Journal.
 Bosque Beast: (2012-2016) Covered animals and pet owners; published six times a year; free to every residence and business in Corrales; delivered free to pickup locations around Albuquerque and Sandoval County.
Local iQ: (2006-2014) Albuquerque lifestyle magazine; contains hyper-local information including arts and entertainment, food, wine, music, film, books, theater, travel, comedy, retail and art, among many other topics; printed bi-weekly; free on the stands.
 Weekly Alibi: (1992-2020) an alternative weekly newspaper published in Albuquerque, featuring news, film, music, art, food, entertainment, blogs, personals and event calendars.

References

Albuquerque